The 1961 World Series was the championship series of Major League Baseball's (MLB) 1961 season. The 58th edition of the World Series, it was a best-of-seven playoff that matched the American League (AL) champion New York Yankees (109–53) against the National League (NL) champion Cincinnati Reds (93–61). The Yankees won in five games to earn their 19th championship in 39 seasons. Yankees pitcher Whitey Ford was named the World Series Most Valuable Player, having won two games while throwing 14 scoreless innings.

This World Series was surrounded by Cold War political puns pitting the "Reds" against the "Yanks." The louder buzz concerned the "M&M Boys", Yankees hitters Roger Maris and Mickey Mantle, who had spent the season pursuing Babe Ruth's single-season home run record set in 1927; Mantle finished with 54 while Maris set the record of 61 on the last day of the season.

The Yankees were under the leadership of first-year manager Ralph Houk, who had succeeded Casey Stengel. The Yankees won the AL pennant, finishing eight games better than the Detroit Tigers. The Yankees also set an MLB record for most home runs in a season with 240. Along with Maris and Mantle, four other Yankees, Yogi Berra, Elston Howard, Bill Skowron, and Johnny Blanchard, hit more than 20 home runs. The pitching staff was led by the Cy Young Award-winner Ford (25–4, 3.21 earned run average).

The underdog Reds, skippered by Fred Hutchinson, finished four games ahead of the Los Angeles Dodgers in the NL and boasted four 20-plus home run hitters of their own: NL MVP Frank Robinson, Gordy Coleman, Gene Freese and Wally Post. The second-base, shortstop, and catcher positions were platooned, while center fielder Vada Pinson led the league in hits with 208 and finished second in batting with a .343 average. Joey Jay (21–10, 3.53) led the staff, along with Jim O'Toole and Bob Purkey.

Ford left the sixth inning of Game 4 due to an injured ankle.

The 1961 five-game series was the shortest since , when the New York Giants swept the Cleveland Indians in four games. These two teams would meet again 15 years later in the 1976 World Series, which the Reds would win in a four-game sweep.

Summary

Matchups

Game 1

At Yankee Stadium, Whitey Ford tossed his third straight World Series shutout. A fourth-inning shot into the lower right-field stands by Elston Howard was all Ford would need. Moose Skowron added a sixth-inning shot into the lower left-field to make it 2–0. The two-hour, 11-minute game featured only two hits by the Reds, a first-inning single to left by Eddie Kasko and a fifth-inning single by Wally Post. The only other Reds baserunner was Frank Robinson, who walked in the seventh. Otherwise, Ford had six strikeouts. Jim O'Toole allowed six hits in seven innings.

Ford was also aided by two excellent defensive plays by third baseman Clete Boyer. In the second inning, Boyer backhanded a Gene Freese ground ball close to the bag, wheeled, and threw out his third-base counterpart from his knees. In the eighth, Boyer dove to his left onto his stomach after a Dick Gernert ground ball; coming up with the ball, Boyer threw Gernert out, also from his knees.

Game 2

The Reds came charging back on superb pitching by Joey Jay to win Game 2 and even the series. Reds first baseman Gordy Coleman and Yankees' left-fielder Yogi Berra traded two-run homers in the fourth. Coleman hit his homer into the right-center field bleachers after Frank Robinson reached on an error by Yankees' third-baseman Clete Boyer. After Roger Maris led off the bottom half of the inning with a walk, Berra tied the score with a drive into the lower right-field stands.

From there, Jay would give up only two more hits, a Berra single in the sixth and a Tony Kubek single to center in the eighth. The Reds continued to score with single runs in the fifth and sixth and two in the eighth. Yankee starter Ralph Terry would give up one more run in the sixth on a Wally Post double and a run- scoring single by eighth-place hitter Johnny Edwards, before being lifted in the seventh for pinch-hitter Héctor López.

Luis Arroyo took over in the eighth and walked Robinson, gave up an infield single to Coleman on a roller between third and the mound and then threw wild to first, with Robinson scoring; Coleman was thrown out trying for third. The next batter, Wally Post, reached safely when Berra misplayed his fly for a three-base error. With Post on third, Gene Freese was intentionally walked for the second time in the game and Edwards followed with his second hit, a bloop double to left, scoring Post. Jay would seal the victory for the Reds by retiring six of the remaining seven batters, allowing only a walk to Clete Boyer in the ninth.

The series shifted to Cincinnati with the pressure on New York. After falling to a perceived inferior team (the Pittsburgh Pirates) in the 1960 World Series, a loss that cost long-time manager Casey Stengel his job, fans and media were wondering if it could happen again as the Yankees limped into Cincinnati with the series tied, having scored a total of just four runs and 10 hits in the first two games as several of the Yankee hitters struggled including the "M&M Boys."

Game 3

Cincinnati hosted its first World Series in 21 years at Crosley Field. 99-year-old Dummy Hoy, a former Red and the oldest living former Major League player at the time, threw out the first pitch. He would die two months later following a stroke, five months short of his 100th birthday.

Game 3 pitted New York's 23-year-old right-hander Bill Stafford against Reds' veteran knuckleballer Bob Purkey. Stafford pitched well for  innings. Purkey also had outstanding control and kept the Yankee hitters off balance, but New York triumphed on a Maris home run in the ninth. While the Yankees' offense still was stagnant, it was just good enough.

Cincinnati struck first with a run in the bottom of the third when Elio Chacón beat out a bunt and took second when Stafford threw wildly to first. Eddie Kasko fouled out to Bill Skowron and Vada Pinson grounded out to send Chacón to third before Frank Robinson hit a double off the left-field wall to make it 1–0.

In the seventh, the Yankees got a big break to tie the game. Tony Kubek led off with a single to center, then took second on a Johnny Edwards passed ball. After Mickey Mantle struck out, Yogi Berra blooped a ball into short right field that neither second baseman Chacón nor right fielder Robinson called before the two collided, allowing the ball to drop as Kubek scored. The Reds regained the lead in their half of the inning when Edwards doubled into the right-field corner and eventually scored on a Kasko single to left. Bud Daley came in to relieve Stafford and retired Pinson on a flyout to right to end the inning.

The Reds' lead was short-lived, as the Yankees tied the score in the eighth. With two outs, Johnny Blanchard (pinch-hitting for Daley), smacked a Purkey knuckler into the right-field bleachers. The Reds went quietly in the bottom of the inning, the score tied at 2–2.

In the ninth, Maris recorded the first of his only two hits in the Series, but this one went into the right-field bleachers for a go-ahead home run. With ace reliever Luis Arroyo on the mound for the Yankees in the ninth, the Reds had one last shot. After Gene Freese struck out, Leo Cárdenas, batting for Johnny Edwards, doubled off the left-center field scoreboard. Dick Gernert, pinch-hitting for Purkey, grounded to short, Cardenas holding. The third pinch-hitter in the inning, Gus Bell, ended the Reds' comeback attempt by grounding back to the mound, Arroyo to Skowron, to end the thriller and give the Yankees a two games to one Series lead.

Game 4

Whitey Ford started Game 4 for the Yankees in an attempt to continue his post-season shutout streak, but more importantly to give the Bombers a 3–1 lead in the Series. He accomplished both. Ford retired the first nine batters of the game; when Elio Chacón grounded out to Bobby Richardson at second base for the final out in the third, Ford broke Babe Ruth's record of  consecutive scoreless innings. Ford remained in the game until the end of the fifth, when an apparent ankle injury forced him to leave, his new record at 32 consecutive scoreless innings. Jim Coates entered the game in the sixth and pitched four scoreless innings.

The Yankees scored the game's first run in the fourth. Roger Maris led off with a walk and went to third on a single to left-center by Mickey Mantle. Elston Howard grounded into a double play, Maris scoring. The Yankees added another run in the fifth on a walk to Ford, a Bobby Richardson single to right-center and a run-scoring single by in Tony Kubek.

In the sixth, O'Toole was relieved by Jim Brosnan who got into a jam. With one out, Howard doubled to right-center. After Yogi Berra was intentionally walked, Skowron loaded the bases by beating out a slow roller to third. Clete Boyer then doubled to left to plate two runs. The Yankees put on the safety squeeze, only to have Ford bunt right to Reds first baseman Gordy Coleman who tagged first base. Boyer had moved to third and Skowron had come halfway home before stopping. Coleman then raced across the diamond and tagged Skowron, who was trapped between third and home, for an unassisted double play.

The Yankees would add three more runs in the seventh to put the game away. New York's seven-run output equaled what the Bronx Bombers were able to put up combined in their first three games as solid Reds starting pitching, combined with a wounded Mantle, kept the New York offense sputtering. That would change in Game 5.

Game 5

Future Hall-of-Famers Yogi Berra and Mickey Mantle sat out Game 5, Berra with a stiff shoulder, Mantle still suffering from a hip abscess. But substitutes Héctor López and Johnny Blanchard more than made up for the absence of the two stars. Lopez drove in five runs with a triple, a home run and a sacrifice bunt, and Blanchard had three hits, including a double and a homer.

In the first four games, the Yankees scored a total of nine runs off Cincinnati's starting pitchers. In Game 5, New York scored five in the first inning. Reds starter Joey Jay, with 14 regular-season complete games, would uncharacteristically get just two outs before being relieved. After Bobby Richardson singled to start the game, Jay retired Tony Kubek and Roger Maris on fly balls. But the flood gates opened when Blanchard hit a two-run homer into the right-field bleachers. Elston Howard was awarded a ground-rule double when his blast went through an opening in the left-center field scoreboard. Bill Skowron followed with a long single off the left-field fence, scoring Howard. Jim Maloney entered the game and was greeted with a Lopez triple that scored Skowron. Clete Boyer continued the assault doubling off the scoreboard, scoring Lopez. The ninth batter of the inning, Yankee pitcher Ralph Terry mercifully struck out to end the inning but not until five Yankees had touched home plate.

New York added to its lead in the second on a Kubek single and a Maris double just inside the left-field line. The Reds cut the lead in half in the bottom of the third and chased Terry in the process. Don Blasingame led off with a single to center, Eddie Kasko singled to left and Vada Pinson hit a fly moving Blasingame to third. Frank Robinson then took Terry deep with a three-run shot over the right-center field fence. Bud Daley replaced Terry and shut the door on the Reds.

The Yankee offense added to its lead with five runs in the fourth, the big blows were a two-run single by Skowron and a three-run home run to dead center by Lopez. The Reds got a little closer after scoring two runs in the bottom of the fifth (on a two-run Wally Post home run) to cut it to 11–5. Then Yankees finished the rout by added two more runs in the sixth on sacrifices by Lopez (on a squeeze play) and Daley (on a fly ball).

This was the final World Series game ever played at Crosley Field, and the last postseason game in Cincinnati until the team moved to  Riverfront Stadium in 1970

Houk became only the third skipper in history to win the World Series in his first season.

Composite line score
1961 World Series (4–1): New York Yankees (A.L.) over Cincinnati Reds (N.L.)

Notes

References

External links

 The History of the Cincinnati Reds at redshistory.com

World Series
World Series
New York Yankees postseason
Cincinnati Reds postseason
World Series
World Series
1960s in Cincinnati
World Series
Baseball competitions in New York City
Baseball competitions in Cincinnati
1960s in the Bronx